Zalm Sur (also Romanized as Z̧alm Sūr; also known as Z̧almeh Sūr, Z̧olmeh Nūr, and Z̧olmeh Sūr) is a village in Khaneh Shur Rural District, in the Central District of Salas-e Babajani County, Kermanshah Province, Iran. At the 2006 census, its population was 115, in 26 families.

References 

Populated places in Salas-e Babajani County